William "Bill" McAlone is a former professional rugby league footballer who played in the 1950s and 1960s. He played for Whitehaven. He played in a forward position. McAlone scored 23 tries in 327 games for Whitehaven.

Playing career

County honours
Bill McAlone represented Cumberland 11 times.

Notable tour matches
Bill McAlone played left-, i.e. number 8, in Whitehaven's 14–11 victory over Australia in the 1956–57 Kangaroo tour of Great Britain and France match at the Recreation Ground, Whitehaven on Saturday 20 October 1956, in front of a crowd of 10,917.

Honoured at Whitehaven
Bill McAlone is a Whitehaven Hall of Fame Inductee, in 2006 he became the third player to be inducted.

References

Living people
Cumberland rugby league team players
English rugby league players
Place of birth missing (living people)
Rugby league players from Cumbria
Rugby league props
Whitehaven R.L.F.C. players
Year of birth missing (living people)